Manuel Ortiz or Ortíz may refer to:

Manuel Ortiz (boxer) (1916-1970), American boxer
Manuel Ortiz (fencer) (1948–2008), Cuban fencer
Manuel Antonio Ortiz (fl.1840-1841), President of Paraguay
Manuel Rivera-Ortiz (born 1968), Puerto Rican-American documentary photographer
Manuel Ortiz Guerrero (1897–1933), Paraguayan poet and musician
Manuel Ortiz Partida, Halloween or Ciclope (born 1971), Mexican wrestler
Manuel Ortiz Toribio (born 1984), Spanish footballer
Manuel Ortiz de Zárate (1887–1946), Chilean painter
Manuel Ortiz (pastor) (1938-2017), American pastor